Gorbio is a commune in the Alpes-Maritimes department in southeastern France.

Gorbio may be seen in the video for Celine Dion's song Falling Into You.

Population
The inhabitants are called Gorbarins.

See also
Communes of the Alpes-Maritimes department

References

Communes of Alpes-Maritimes
Alpes-Maritimes communes articles needing translation from French Wikipedia